Bootleg Series Volume 1: The Quine Tapes is a triple live album by The Velvet Underground. It was released on October 16, 2001, by Polydor, the record label overseeing the band's UMG back catalogue. It was recorded by Robert Quine, a fan of the band who would later become an influential guitarist, playing with Richard Hell, Lou Reed, and Lloyd Cole.

The Quine Tapes
During 1969, the Velvet Underground toured the United States and Canada, playing well over 70 dates. By this time, the band had picked up a sizeable fan base and every now and then a fan would bring along, with consent of the band, recording equipment to record a set. Most of the time, this would mean relatively simple hand-held recorders resulting in lo-fi mono audience recordings, as with this set and the live album Live at Max's Kansas City (1972) (1969: The Velvet Underground Live was the notable exception, using stereo soundboard recordings).

Robert Quine, an avid Velvet Underground fan, used to travel to as many concerts as possible. He became friends with the band and they allowed him to record sets from the audience, occasionally asking for playbacks. Quine recorded many concerts, but as his original musicassette tapes began to wear out, he compiled four reels of what he considered the best material. These "best-of" reels were ultimately released in 2001 as the present The Quine Tapes set. The original musicassettes from which the reels were compiled no longer exist.

Musically, The Quine Tapes finds the band in the same phase in their history as documented on 1969—the two sets even share a performance of "Rock and Roll", recorded at the same concert by both Quine and the Matrix sound personnel. Quine's tapes, although lo-fi audience recordings, capture much more of the music's ambience, especially in the larger venues, such as Washington University in St. Louis. Additionally, The Quine Tapes contains songs that the band only rarely performed by this time, such as "Sunday Morning", "Venus in Furs" and "The Black Angel's Death Song", along with other obscurities such as "Over You", "Ride into the Sun", and "Follow the Leader", which had never even been bootlegged in its original form.

The Bootleg Series 
The Quine Tapes is, to date, the only entry in the Bootleg Series. The second volume was to be a recording of an April 1967 show at The Gymnasium in New York City, which marked the live debut of "Sister Ray". Two songs from the show, "Guess I'm Falling in Love" and "Booker T", appeared on the box set Peel Slowly and See (1995), and the full show was released in December 2013 as part of the "Super Deluxe" reissue of White Light/White Heat. It contains the only known recorded performance of "I'm Not a Young Man Anymore".

Monetary disputes between the band and Universal have apparently put a hold on future entries in the series. This same dispute over a revised contract also kept "Miss Joanie Lee," recorded during a rehearsal at Andy Warhol's Factory, from appearing on the deluxe two-disc reissue of The Velvet Underground & Nico.

Tracklisting

Personnel
The Velvet Underground
 Sterling Morrison – lead and rhythm guitar, backing vocals, bass
 Lou Reed – vocals, rhythm and lead guitar
 Maureen Tucker – percussion, lead vocals on "After Hours" and "I'm Sticking with You"
 Doug Yule – bass guitar, organ, backing vocals, lead vocal on "Ride into the Sun"

Technical staff
 Robert Quine – recording engineer
 The Velvet Underground – producers

References

External links
 The Velvet Underground Web Page
 Foggy Notion – a Velvet Underground Web Corner

2001 live albums
The Velvet Underground live albums
Polydor Records live albums